Prince An of the First Rank, or simply Prince An, was the title of a princely peerage used in China during the Manchu-led Qing dynasty (1644–1912). As the Prince A peerage was not awarded "iron-cap" status, this meant that each successive bearer of the title would normally start off with a title downgraded by one rank vis-à-vis that held by his predecessor. However, the title would generally not be downgraded to any lower than a feng'en fuguo gong except under special circumstances.

The first bearer of the title was Abatai (1589–1646), the seventh son of Nurhaci, the founder of the Qing dynasty. In 1644, he was awarded the status of a junwang (prince of the second rank) by his nephew, the Shunzhi Emperor, under the title "Prince Raoyu of the Second Rank" ( doroi bayan giyūn wang) or simply "Prince Raoyu". The title was renamed to "Prince An of the Second Rank" in 1651 when it was passed down to Abatai's fourth son, Yolo (1625–1689). In 1723, the Yongzheng Emperor abolished the Prince An peerage on the grounds that Yolo had "sowed discord among key ministers and disrespected the Emperor". However, in 1778, the Qianlong Emperor considered Abatai and Yolo's past contributions to the Qing Empire, and decided to restore the Prince An peerage as a feng'en fuguo gong title – the lowest possible grade for a princely peerage. Qikun, a great-great-grandson of Yolo, was selected to inherit the title. The title was passed down over a total of ten generations and was held by ten persons.

Members of the Prince An / Prince Raoyu peerage

 Abatai (1589–1646), Nurhaci's seventh son, initially a beile from 1626 to 1644, awarded the title "Raoyu" in 1636, promoted to junwang (second-rank prince) in 1644, posthumously honoured as Prince Raoyumin of the First Rank (饒餘敏親王) in 1662
 Yolo (岳樂; 1625–1689), Abatai's fourth son, held the title Prince An of the Second Rank from 1651 to 1654, promoted to qinwang (first-rank prince) in 1654, posthumously honoured as Prince Anhe of the First Rank (安和郡王), posthumously demoted to a junwang in 1700 and stripped of his posthumous title
 Ma'erhun (瑪爾渾; 1663–1709), Yolo's 15th son, held the title Prince An of the Second Rank from 1689 to 1709, posthumously honoured as Prince Anyi of the Second Rank (安懿郡王)
 Huayi (華圯; 1685–1718), Ma'erhun's second son, held the title Prince An of the Second Rank from 1709 to 1718, posthumously honoured as Prince Anjie of the Second Rank (安節郡王)
 Huabin (華彬; 1686–1735), Ma'erhun's third son, held a feng'en jiangjun title from 1705 to 1733, stripped of his title in 1733
 Xigui (錫貴; 1707–1772), Huabin's second son, posthumously honoured as a feng'en fuguo gong
 Daiying (岱英; 1730–1780), Xigui's eldest son, posthumously honoured as a feng'en fuguo gong
 Qikun (奇崑; 1739–1783), Xigui's second son, held the title of a feng'en fuguo gong from 1778 to 1783
 Chongji (崇積; 1780–1821), Qikun's third son, held the title of a feng'en fuguo gong from 1783 to 1804, stripped of his title in 1804
 Bulantai (布蘭泰; 1751–1821), Daiying's second son, held the title of a feng'en fuguo gong from 1805 to 1821
 Hengming (亨明; 1799–1860), Bulantai's fourth son, held the title of a feng'en fuguo gong from 1821 to 1860
 Yushan (裕善), Hengming's eldest son, held a fengguo jiangjun title from 1844 to 1854
 Huipu (惠普), Yushan's eldest son, held a feng'en jiangjun title from 1854–?
 Yu'an (裕安), Hengming's second son, held a fengguo jiangjun title from 1850 to 1875, had no male heir
 Yuke (裕恪; 1843–1873), Hengming's third son, held the title of a feng'en fuguo gong from 1861 to 1873
 Yipu (意普; 1868–?), Yuke's second son, held the title of a feng'en fuguo gong from 1873–?

Šanggiyan's line

 Abatai
 Šanggiyan (尚建; 1606–1630), Abatai's eldest son, held a beizi title, posthumously honoured as Xianque Beizi (賢慤貝子)
 Subutu (蘇布圖; 1625–1648), Šanggiyan's eldest son, initially a feng'en fuguo gong, promoted to beizi in 1646, posthumously honoured as Daomin Beizi (悼愍貝子)
 Qiangdu (強度; 1630–1651), Šanggiyan's second son, held a beizi title from 1649 to 1651, posthumously honoured as Jiejie Beizi (介潔貝子)
 Yanling (顏齡; 1648–1701), Subutu's eldest son, held a feng'en zhenguo gong title from 1652 to 1701, had no male heir

Bohoto's line

 Abatai
 Bohoto (博和託; 1610–1648), Abatai's second son, initially a feng'en fuguo gong, promoted to beizi in 1644, posthumously honoured as Wenliang Beizi (溫良貝子)
 Wenggu (翁古; died 1647), Bohoto's eldest son, posthumously honoured as Feng'en Fuguo Huaimin Gong (奉恩輔國懷愍公)
 Bowei (博危), Wenggu's eldest son, held a feng'en fuguo gong title from 1647 to 1649, had no male heir
 Jinzhu (錦注), Bohoto's second son, posthumously honoured as Feng'en Fuguo Huaiyi Gong (奉恩輔國懷儀公), had no male heir
 Fokeqiku (佛克齊庫), Bohoto's third son, posthumously honoured as Jiejie Beizi (介潔貝子), had no male heir
 Zhangtai (彰泰; 1636–1690), Bohoto's fourth son, initially a feng'en zhenguo gong, held a beizi title from 1652 to 1690
 Baishou (百綬; 1654–1691), Zhangtai's eldest son, held a feng'en zhenguo gong title from 1668 to 1686, demoted to zhenguo jiangjun in 1686, stripped of his title in 1688
 Mingrui (明瑞; 1666–1715), Zhangtai's fifth son, held a feng'en zhenguo gong title from 1680 to 1698, stripped of his title in 1698
 Tunzhu (屯珠; 1658–1718), Zhangtai's third son, held a feng'en zhenguo gong title from 1690 to 1718, posthumously awarded beizi status and honoured as Feng'en Zhenguo Kemin Gong (奉恩鎮國恪敏公)
 Anzhan (安詹; 1694–1696), Tunzhu's eldest son
 Wenzhao (文昭), Tunzhu's second son
 Fengxin (逢信; 1706–1787), Wenzhao's third son and Anzhan's adoptive son, held a feng'en fuguo gong title from 1718 to 1747, posthumously honoured as Feng'en Fuguo Gongke Gong (奉恩輔國恭恪公)
 Shengchang (盛昌; 1751–1821), Fengxin's second son, held a feng'en fuguo gong title from 1747 to 1757, stripped of his title in 1757, restored as a zhenguo jiangjun in 1758 and then promoted back to feng'en fuguo gong
 Chengmian (成綿; 1761–?), Shengchang's eldest son
 Qingyi (慶怡l 1763–1813), Shengchang's second son, held a second class fuguo jiangjun title from 1784 to 1787, promoted to feng'en fuguo gong in 1787
 Jingxi (景錫; 1793–1834), Chengmian's eldest son
 Jinglun (景綸; 1796–1847), Chengmian's second son and Qingyi's adoptive son, held a feng'en fuguo gong title from 1813 to 1839, stripped of his title in 1839
 Jingchong (景崇; 1811–1880), Chengmian's fifth son, held a feng'en fuguo gong title from 1839 to 1858, stripped of his title in 1858
 Chunkan (純堪; 1819–1882), Jingxi's third son, held a feng'en fuguo gong title from 1859 to 1882
 Linjia (麟嘉; 1851–1901), Chunkan's eldest son, held a second class fuguo jiangjun title from 1883 to 1889, promoted to feng'en fuguo gong in 1889
 Zengpei (增培; 1883–?), Rongsen's second son and Linjia's adoptive son, held a feng'en fuguo gong title from 1902–?

Bolo's line

Yolo's line

 Abatai
 Yolo
 Saileng'e (塞楞額; died 1698), Yolo's eighth son, held a third class fuguo jiangjun title from 1672 to 1698
 Sehentu (色痕圖), Saileng'e's eldest son, held a second class fengguo jiangjun title from 1699 to 1722, stripped of his title in 1722
 Sebei (色貝), Saileng'e's fourth son, held a feng'en jiangjun title from 1705 to 1751
 Saichong'a (賽沖阿), Sebei's 12th son, held a feng'en jiangjun title from 1751 to 1793
 Wu'erxisong'a (烏爾希松阿), Saichong'a's second son, held a feng'en jiangjun title from 1793 to 1814, had no male heir
 Wu'ertu (務爾圖), Saileng'e's sixth son, held a feng'en jiangjun title from 1732 to 1750
 Linggao (齡高), Wu'ertu's eldest son, held a feng'en jiangjun title from 1735 to 1771
 Dazong'a (達宗阿), Linggao's son
 Yichong'e (伊崇額), Dazong'a's eldest son, held a feng'en jiangjun title from 1771 to 1779, stripped of his title in 1779
 Lingsong (齡嵩), Wu'ertu's second son
 Daqing'a (達慶阿), Lingsong's eldest son, held a feng'en jiangjun title from 1756 to 1769
 Xiwen (熙文), Sehentu's second son, held a feng'en jiangjun title from 1711 to 1725, stripped of his title in 1725
 Chuonai (綽鼐), Sehentu's third son, held a feng'en jiangjun title from 1712 to 1723, stripped of his title in 1723
 Saibuli (塞布禮), Yolo's 16th son, held a third class fuguo jiangjun title from 1678 to 1708, stripped of his title in 1708
 Jingxi (經希), Yolo's 17th son; see Prince Xi for details
 Yunduan (蘊端; 1671–1705), Yolo's 18th son; see Prince Qin for details

Family tree

See also
 Royal and noble ranks of the Qing dynasty

References
 

Qing dynasty princely peerages
Peerages of the Plain Blue Banner